Paul Hampshire (20 September 1981 – 13 March 2022) was a Scottish professional footballer.

Career
Hampshire started his career with Raith Rovers before signing for Berwick Rangers. He then moved to East Fife in 2005 before finding his way to junior football with Dunbar. Hampshire then moved to Cornwall, signing for Newquay.

Personal life
Hampshire was killed after being hit by a car on the A1 near Dunbar on 13 March 2022, at the age of 40. His older brother Steven also played professional football.

References

External links
 

1981 births
2022 deaths
Association football midfielders
Berwick Rangers F.C. players
Dunbar United F.C. players
East Fife F.C. players
Footballers from Edinburgh
Newquay A.F.C. players
Raith Rovers F.C. players
Road incident deaths in Scotland
Scottish Football League players
Scottish footballers
Pedestrian road incident deaths